John Henry Neagle (January 2, 1858 in Syracuse, New York – September 20, 1904 in Syracuse, New York), was a professional baseball pitcher in the major leagues from -. He played for the Cincinnati Reds, Philadelphia Quakers, Baltimore Orioles, and Pittsburgh Alleghenys. He is the first pitcher in the history of the Phillies franchise to record a win doing so on May 14, 1883 in the team's 9th game of the season.

References

External links

Major League Baseball pitchers
Baseball players from Syracuse, New York
Pittsburgh Alleghenys players
Baltimore Orioles (AA) players
Philadelphia Quakers players
Cincinnati Reds (1876–1879) players
19th-century baseball players
1858 births
1904 deaths
New York Metropolitans (minor league) players
Macon (minor league baseball) players
Philadelphia Phillies (minor league) players